Aurora was an American Christian girl group that was made up of sisters Lauren, Racquel and Rachel Smith from Georgia. The sisters all played instruments, and wrote songs. The group released two major albums with labels Pamplin and Red Hill Records.  Aurora in 2000 and Bigger than Us in 2001, and released singles "Mercy Me", “Bigger than Us”, and "Outta My Head",  on both US and UK radio.

Their top single peaked at position #32 on Billboard music charts, and was #1 on the Christian hit Music chart (Src:air1). The band garnered a large airplay and fan base in the UK.  

As performers, the sisters combined their experience in theater, dancing, instruments, and singing, and become one of the first christian pop groups with heavy dance beats and choreography on stage.  They have performed in front of crowds as large as 85,000. Because of their energetic personalities and humble approachability, the group was always a favorite among their audiences. They intrigued crowds with the tight harmonies only families tend to possess.  

After years of professionally touring and performing, the group officially dissolved in 2004.

Discography

Aurora (2000)

A World With You
Loving Me Like You Do
Finer Love
Mercy Me
Life In Your Hands
Forget Me Not
If You Didn't Love Me Anymore
Out of My Mind
Before the Throne of God
Different Drum

Bigger Than Us (2001)

Just the Way You Are
The Way That You Love Me
I Dedicate This Heart to You
Bigger than Us
Turn It Around
Go On
Closer To You
Shout
Rekindle the Flame
Forever

Singles
"Mercy Me"
"Outta My head"
“World with you”

References

External links
 Aurora

All-female bands
American Christian musical groups
British Christian musical groups
Christian pop groups
Musical groups established in 2000